William Ringrose (2 September 1871 – 14 September 1943) was an English first-class cricketer, who played fifty seven  games for Yorkshire County Cricket Club between 1901 and 1906, and four games for Scotland between 1908 and 1912.  He also appeared for the Yorkshire Second XI (1901–1905), Yorkshire Colts (1902) and Major Shaw's XI (1906).

Born in Ganton, East Riding of Yorkshire (now North Yorkshire), Ringrose was a right arm fast medium bowler, who took 175 first-class wickets at 20.38, with a best return of 9 for 76 against the Australian tourists.  He also took 7 for 51 against Leicestershire and 7 for 86 against Nottinghamshire.  He took five wickets in an innings eleven times and ten wickets in a match twice.  A left-handed tail end batsman, he scored 377 runs at 5.98, with a highest score of 23 against Leicestershire and took 27 catches in the field. Ringrose died in September 1943 in Manston, Cross Gates, Leeds, Yorkshire.

References

External links
Cricinfo Profile
Cricket Archive Statistics

1871 births
1943 deaths
Yorkshire cricketers
English cricketers
People from Ganton
Sportspeople from Yorkshire